Kurdish Jews in Israel are immigrants and descendants of the immigrants of the Kurdish Jewish communities, who now reside within the state of Israel. They number between 200,000 to 500,000.

History
Immigration of Kurdish Jews to the Land of Israel initiated during the late 16th century, with a community of rabbinic scholars arriving to Safed, Galilee, and a Kurdish Jewish quarter had been established there as a result. The thriving period of Safed however ended in 1660, with Druze power struggles in the region and an economic decline.

Many Kurdish Jews, especially the ones who hail from Iraq, went through a Sephardic Jewish blending during the 18th century.

Since the early 20th century, some Kurdish Jews had been active in the Zionist movement. One of the most famous members of Lehi (Freedom Fighters of Israel) was Moshe Barazani, whose family immigrated from Iraq and settled in Jerusalem in the late 1920s. In 1939, there were 4,369 in Jerusalem, growing to 30,000 in 1972.

The vast majority of Kurdish Jews were forced out by Iraqi authorities, being evacuated to Israel in the early 1950s, together with other Iraqi Jewish community. The vast majority of the Kurdish Jews of Iranian Kurdistan relocated mostly to Israel as well, in the 1950s.

The Times of Israel reported on September 30, 2013: "Today, there are almost 200,000 Kurdish Jews in Israel, about half of whom live in Jerusalem. There are also over 30 agricultural villages throughout the country that were founded by Kurdish Jews." Today, the large majority of the Jews of "Kurdistan" and their descendants live in Israel.

Settlements
Agur
Avital
Azaria
Beit Yosef
Givolim
Ein HaEmek
Ein Ya'akov
Even Sapir
Meitav
Mlilot
Nes Harim
Neve Michael
Patish
Prazon
Sdei Trumot
Shibolim
Talmei Bilu
Revaha
Yardena
Zekharia

Notable people
 Moshe Barazani
 Zvi Bar
 Yosef Shiloach
 Yitzhak Mordechai
 Itzik Kala
 Mickey Levy
 Mossi Raz
 Ran Raz
 Yona Sabar
 Uri Malmilian
 Haviv Shimoni
 Itzik Shmuli
 Zvi Yehezkeli
 Miki Geva
 Or Sasson
 Itamar Ben-Gvir
 Idan Amedi
 Yehezkel Zakai

See also 
History of the Jews in Kurdistan
Jewish ethnic divisions
Aliyah
Iranian Jews in Israel
Iraqi Jews in Israel
Turkish Jews in Israel
Demographics of Israel
Iraqi Kurdistan–Israel relations
Palestinian Jews

References 

 

Israeli Jews by region
 
 
 
 
 
Ethnic groups in Israel
Ethnic groups in the Middle East